XS All Areas – The Greatest Hits is an album by English rock band Status Quo, released in September 2004. It is a best-of compilation with two new tracks, "You'll Come 'Round" and "Thinking of You".

Track listing

Disc 1
 Caroline (Francis Rossi and Bob Young) 4:18 from the album Hello! 1973
 Down Down (Francis Rossi and Bob Young) 3:38 from the album On the Level 1975
 Paper Plane (Francis Rossi and Bob Young) 2:53 from the album Piledriver 1972
 Big Fat Mama (Francis Rossi and Rick Parfitt) 4:52 from the album Piledriver 1972
 Roll Over Lay Down (Francis Rossi, Bob Young, Rick Parfitt, Alan Lancaster and John Coghlan) 5:38  from the album Hello! 1973
 Softer Ride (Rick Parfitt and Alan Lancaster) 4:02  from the album Hello! 1973
 Don't Waste My Time (Francis Rossi and Bob Young) 4:19 from the album Piledriver 1972
 Little Lady (Rick Parfitt) 3:02 from the album On the Level 1975
 Mystery Song (Rick Parfitt and Bob Young) 3:56 from the album Blue for You 1976
 Rain (Rick Parfitt) 4:33 from the album Blue for You 1976
 Break the Rules (Francis Rossi and Bob Young) 3:38 from the album Quo 1974
 Something 'Bout You Baby I Like (Richard Supa) 2:39 from the album Never Too Late 1981
 Hold You Back (Francis Rossi, Rick Parfitt and Bob Young) 4:29 from the album Rockin' All Over the World 1977
 Rockin' All Over the World (Fogerty) 3:34 from the album Rockin' All Over the World 1977
 Whatever You Want (Rick Parfitt and Andy Bown) 4:01 from the album Whatever You Want 1979
 Don't Drive My Car (Rick Parfitt and Andy Bown) 4:13 from the album Just Supposin' 1980
 Again and Again (Rick Parfitt, Andy Bown and Lynton) 3:39 from the album If You Can't Stand the Heat... 1978
 Forty Five Hundred Times (Francis Rossi and Rick Parfitt) 7:40 from the album Hello! 1973
 All Stand Up (Francis Rossi and Bob Young) 4:10 from the album Heavy Traffic 2002

Disc 2
 You'll Come 'Round (Francis Rossi and Bob Young) 3:25 new track 2004
 Thinking of You (Francis Rossi and Bob Young) 3:55 new track 2004
 Jam Side Down (Terry Britten and Charlie Dore) 3:26 from the album Heavy Traffic 2002
 Creepin' Up On You (Rick Parfitt and John "Rhino" Edwards) 5:01 from the album Heavy Traffic 2002
 Down the Dustpipe (Carl Groszman) 2:21 this version from the album Riffs 2003 (original version single A side 1970) 
 Pictures of Matchstick Men (Francis Rossi) 3:10 from the album Picturesque Matchstickable Messages 1968
 Ice in the Sun (Marty Wilde and Ronnie Scott) 2:12 from the album Picturesque Matchstickable Messages 1968
 In My Chair (Francis Rossi and Bob Young) 3:10 single A side 1970
 Gerdundula (Francis Rossi and Bob Young) 3:20 from the album Dog of Two Head 1971
 Wild Side of Life (Arlie Carter and William Warren) 3:15 single A side 1976
 Rock 'n' Roll (Francis Rossi and Bernie Frost) 4:02  from the album Just Supposin' 1980
 What You're Proposing (Francis Rossi and Bernie Frost) 4:15 from the album Just Supposin' 1980
 The Wanderer (Ernie Maresca) 3:26 from the album 12 Gold Bars Vol. 2 1984
 Living on an Island (Rick Parfitt and Bob Young) 3:45 from the album Whatever You Want 1979
 Marguerita Time (Francis Rossi and Bernie Frost) 3:27 from the album Back to Back 1983
 In the Army Now (Rob Bolland and Ferdi Bolland) 4:40 from the album In the Army Now 1986
 When You Walk in the Room (Jackie DeShannon) 3:02 from the album Don't Stop 1996
 Burning Bridges (Francis Rossi and Andy Bown) 4:19 from the album Ain't Complaining 1988
 Fun Fun Fun (Mike Love and Brian Wilson) 4:03 from the album Don't Stop 1996
 Old Time Rock and Roll (George Jackson and Thomas E. Jones III) 2:57 from the album Famous in the Last Century 2000
 The Anniversary Waltz Part 1 (Lee/Kind/Mack/Mendlesohn/Chuck Berry/Ernie Maresca/Dave Bartholomew/King/Albert Collins/Richard Penniman/Hammer/Otis Blackwell) 5:32 from the album Rocking All Over the Years 1990

Charts

Certifications

References

2004 greatest hits albums
Status Quo (band) compilation albums